Pärssinen is a Finnish surname. Notable people with the surname include:

 Hilja Pärssinen (1876–1935), Finnish schoolteacher, poet, journalist and politician
 Juuso Pärssinen
 Matti Pärssinen (1896–1951), Finnish farmer and politician
 Raimo Pärssinen (born 1956), Swedish politician
 Marja Pärssinen (born 1971), Finnish butterfly and freestyle swimmer
 Timo Pärssinen (born 1977), Finnish professional ice hockey forward

Finnish-language surnames